A roadheader, also called a boom-type roadheader, road header machine, road header or just header machine, is a piece of excavating equipment consisting of a boom-mounted cutting head, a loading device usually involving a conveyor, and a crawler travelling track to move the entire machine forward into the rock face.

The cutting head can be a general purpose rotating drum mounted in line or perpendicular to the boom, or can be special function heads such as jackhammer-like spikes, compression fracture micro-wheel heads like those on larger tunnel boring machines, a slicer head like a gigantic chain saw for dicing up rock, or simple jaw-like buckets of traditional excavators.

History 

The first roadheader patent was applied for by Dr. Z. Ajtay in Hungary, in 1949. It was invented as a remote operated miner for exploitation of small seam, close walled deposits, typically in wet conditions.

Types 
Cutting Heads:
 Transverse - rotates parallel to the cutter boom axis
 Longitudinal - rotates perpendicular to boom axis

Uses 
Roadheaders were initially used in coal mines. The first use in a civil engineering project was the construction of the City Loop (then called the Melbourne Underground Rail Loop) in the 1970s, where the machines enabled around 80% of the excavation to be performed mechanically.

They are now widely used in such as tunneling both for mining and municipal government projects, building wine caves, and building cave homes such as those in Coober Pedy, Australia.

On February 21, 2014, Waller Street, just south of Laurier Avenue collapsed into an 8m-wide and 12m-deep sink-hole where a roadheader was excavating the eastern entrance to Ottawa's LRT O-Train tunnel. A similar incident occurred in June 2016, when a sink-hole opened up in Rideau Street during further construction of the tunnel, and filled with water up to a depth of three metres. The CBC reported that one of Rideau Transit Group’s 135-tonne roadheaders was in a part of the tunnel where the flooding was the deepest. Three roadheaders were used in the construction of the O-Train.

Projects utilizing roadheaders 
 Boston's Big Dig
 Ground Zero Cleanup
 Addison Airport Toll Tunnel
 Fourth bore of Caldecott Tunnel
 Malmö City Tunnel
 Confederation Line, Ottawa

References

External links

An article on underground home design and construction, with a section on use of roadheader machines.
Ripping head roadheader Video

Engineering vehicles
Mining equipment
Excavating equipment